The Painted Lady is a 1924 American drama film directed by Chester Bennett and written by Thomas Dixon Jr. The film stars George O'Brien, Dorothy Mackaill, Harry T. Morey, Lucille Hutton, Lucille Ricksen, and Margaret McWade. The film was released on September 28, 1924, by Fox Film Corporation.

Plot
As described in a film magazine, Violet (Mackaill) hurries to save her half-sister Pearl when she receives a message that Pearl with others is robbing a house. She is caught and sent to jail for three years while Pearl escapes. As a governess, she is hounded by the law until she becomes a "painted lady." She goes on a tour of the South Seas with wealthy Roger Lewis (Elliott). In a storm at sea, the yacht is destroyed. Violet is picked up by a vessel and finds love with Luther Smith (O'Brien) onboard, who saves her from the clutches of Captain Sutton (Morey).

Cast             
George O'Brien as Luther Smith
Dorothy Mackaill as Violet
Harry T. Morey as Captain Sutton
Lucille Hutton as Pearl Thompson
Lucille Ricksen as Alice Smith
Margaret McWade as Mrs. Smith
John Miljan as Carter
Frank Elliott as Roger Lewis
Lucien Littlefield as Matt Logan

Censorship concerns
The Motion Picture Producers and Distributors of America, formed by the film industry in 1922, regulated the content of films through a list of subjects that were to be avoided. While Dorothy Mackaill portrayed a prostitute in The Painted Lady, this was acceptable as prostitution was not explicitly barred so long as it was not forced (i.e., white slavery) and aspects of her work was not shown in the film.

References

External links

1924 films
1920s English-language films
Silent American drama films
1924 drama films
Fox Film films
Films directed by Chester Bennett
American silent feature films
American black-and-white films
1920s American films